Van Ornam & Murdock Block, also known as Lee House Block, is a historic commercial block located at Port Henry in Essex County, New York.  The block consists of four attached structures in the Italianate style built between 1874 and about 1880.  It is the focal point of the Port Henry business district.  The Van Ornam Block was built in 1874 and is a -story brick building with an ornately bracketed wood cornice.  The 4-story Lee House Hotel was also built in 1874 and is a 4-story brick structure.  The next building was built about 1880 and is a 2-story wood-frame building with a stamped metal facade.  The Harlan building is last on the block and it was also built about 1880. It is a 2-story, flat-roofed brick structure.

It was listed on the National Register of Historic Places in 1982.

References

Commercial buildings on the National Register of Historic Places in New York (state)
Italianate architecture in New York (state)
Buildings and structures in Essex County, New York
National Register of Historic Places in Essex County, New York